The Băicoi Nord oil field is an oil field located in Băicoi, Prahova County. It was discovered in 1901 and developed by Petrom. It began production in 1903 and produces oil.

References

Oil fields in Romania